The Italy–Spain football rivalry sometimes referred to as the Mediterranean derby, is a football rivalry between the national football teams of Italy and Spain, the two countries have won five FIFA World Cups and five UEFA European Championship between them. Italy has won four FIFA World Cups and two UEFA European Championships while Spain have won one FIFA World Cups and three UEFA European Championships. They have played against each other three times in the World Cup and six times in the European Championship, including each of the previous four Euros from 2008 to 2020 editions. Most notably, the two met at the UEFA Euro 2012 Final, which Spain won 4–0. They also met at the 2013 FIFA Confederations Cup and the 2020–21 UEFA Nations League semi-finals.

Spain has won 12, and Italy 11, of the 39 matches between them (including four at the Summer Olympic Games in the 1920s). Although the two nations are not immediate geographical neighbours, their rivalry at international level is enhanced by the strong performances of the representative clubs in UEFA competitions, in which they are among the leading associations and have each enjoyed spells of dominance. Including the defunct UEFA Cup Winners' Cup, twelve continental finals have been contested between an Italian and a Spanish representative (Spain dominate this with eight victories). The frequent meetings between the clubs have led to the elite players becoming very familiar with one another when they meet at national level. The two nations' under-21 teams, which are also among the strongest in the world, are also acknowledged as rivals.

List of matches

Comparison of Italy's and Spain's positions in major international tournaments
 Key
 Denotes which team finished better in that particular competition.
DNQ: Did not qualify.
DNP: Did not participate.
TBD: To be determined.

Major encounters

1934 FIFA World Cup
On 31 May, Italy faced Spain in the quarter-final of the 1934 FIFA World Cup, where the two sides drew 1–1 after extra time with Spanish goal by Luis Regueiro in the 30th minute and Italian goal by Giovanni Ferrari in the 44th minute. They then faced off again in the replay match the following day to settle the team that advances; Italy won the replay 1–0 win the goal coming from Giuseppe Meazza in the 11th minute. Italy went on to win their first World Cup title.

Replay

UEFA Euro 1988
On 14 June, Italy and Spain were matched up for the second match in the group stage, where Italy won 1–0 with the goal coming from Gianluca Vialli in the 73rd minute. Italy went on to win their last group match, while Spain lost theirs; Italy made it out of the group, while Spain did not.

1994 FIFA World Cup
On 9 July, Italy won the quarter-final match up against Spain in the 1994 World Cup 2–1 quarter-final at Foxboro Stadium, with Italian Dino Baggio scoring first in the 25th minute, the Spaniards equalised with a goal from José Luis Caminero in the 58th minute, before Roberto Baggio sealed the Italian victory in the 88th minute. A controversy in the match was Mauro Tassotti's elbow on Spanish player Luis Enrique, but during the match the incident went unpunished – Tassotti was later banned for eight games.

UEFA Euro 2008
On 22 June, Italy and Spain were matched up for a quarter-final in Euro 2008; the game ended a goalless draw after 120 minutes and resulted in a penalty shoot-out which Spain won 4–2. Spain went on to win the European Championship for the second time.

UEFA Euro 2012

On 1 July, Spain and Italy were matched up for the final of Euro 2012. The sides had already met in the group stage, drawing 1–1. Spain took the lead in the 14th minute, though, when Andrés Iniesta played a through-ball to Cesc Fàbregas, who drove past Italian defender Giorgio Chiellini to the by-line before pulling back a cross for David Silva to head into the net from six yards. Chiellini was clearly struggling with a thigh injury he had picked up in the earlier rounds, and he was replaced by Federico Balzaretti after 20 minutes. Italy responded with a couple of shots from Antonio Cassano that were saved by Spain goalkeeper Iker Casillas, but Spain doubled their lead before half-time when Xavi picked out left-back Jordi Alba, who capped a long forward run with a precise finish past Gianluigi Buffon in the Italy goal.

Antonio Di Natale came on for Cassano at half-time and twice went close to scoring, the second effort forcing a save from the onrushing Casillas. Italy's final substitution saw Thiago Motta replace Riccardo Montolivo, but he soon suffered a hamstring injury; with all of their substitutes used, Italy had to play the last 30 minutes of the match with ten men. Fernando Torres replaced Fàbregas with 15 minutes left to play, and scored in the 84th minute – assisted by Xavi – to become the first man to score in two European Championship finals. Torres then turned provider four minutes later, cutting the ball back with the outside of his boot for fellow substitute and Chelsea forward Juan Mata to sweep into an empty net for a final score of 4–0, the widest margin of victory in any European Championship final. Spain became the first team to retain the European Championship title and also the first European team to win three major international competitions in a row.

2013 FIFA Confederations Cup
On 27 June, the semi-final of the 2013 Confederations Cup in Brazil was contested between Italy and Spain, where after a goalless 120 minutes, Spain won 7–6 in the resulting penalty shoot-out; Italy's Leonardo Bonucci was the only player to miss.

UEFA Euro 2016
On 27 June, Italy and Spain matched up for the round of 16 in the Euro 2016, in a rematch of the previous tournament's final. Italy won 2–0 with goals from Giorgio Chiellini in the 33rd minute and Graziano Pellè in stoppage time of the second half. Spanish goalkeeper David de Gea made several impressive saves to keep Spain in the match, notably on Pellè's first-half header attempt, however, it ultimately ended in defeat, eliminating the defending European champions Spain.

2018 FIFA World Cup qualifying
Italy was not seeded into the first pot, being placed into the second pot due to being in 17th place in the FIFA World Rankings at the time of the group draws; Italy and Spain, from pot one, were drawn together on 25 July 2015. Italy and Spain drew 1–1 in Turin on 6 October 2016, followed by a 3–0 Spain win in Madrid on 2 September 2017, as Spain topped Group G, leaving Italy in second place five points behind. Italy were then required to go through the play-off against Sweden. After a 1–0 aggregate loss to Sweden, on 13 November 2017, Italy failed to qualify for the 2018 FIFA World Cup for the first time since 1958.

UEFA Euro 2020
On 6 July 2021, Italy and Spain faced each other in the semi-finals of the Euro 2020 (held in 2021 due to the COVID-19 pandemic) at Wembley Stadium in London, marking the fourth consecutive European Championship that the sides meet. Italy and Spain, could not break the deadlock after 120 minutes, and Italy won 4–2 in the resulting penalty shoot-out en route to their first European title in 53 years.

2021 UEFA Nations League finals
On 6 October 2021, Italy and Spain faced each other in the semi-finals of the 2020–21 UEFA Nations League at San Siro in Milan. Spain ended Italy's world-record 37-game unbeaten run with a 2–1 win to reach their first UEFA Nations League final. Italy, defeated at home in a competitive game for the first time since 1999, thus failed in their attempt to emulate Portugal's achievement of holding the Nations League and European Championship titles simultaneously.

Statistics

Overall

See also
 Football derbies in Italy
 Italy–Spain relations
 List of association football rivalries

References

External links

Italy national football team rivalries
Spain national football team rivalries
International association football rivalries
Italy–Spain relations
Italy at the 1934 FIFA World Cup
Italy at UEFA Euro 1980
Italy at UEFA Euro 1988
Italy at the 1994 FIFA World Cup
Italy at UEFA Euro 2008
Italy at UEFA Euro 2012
Italy at the 2013 FIFA Confederations Cup
Italy at UEFA Euro 2016
Italy at UEFA Euro 2020
Spain at the 1934 FIFA World Cup
Spain at UEFA Euro 1980
Spain at UEFA Euro 1988
Spain at the 1994 FIFA World Cup
Spain at UEFA Euro 2008
Spain at UEFA Euro 2012
Spain at the 2013 FIFA Confederations Cup
Spain at UEFA Euro 2016
Spain at UEFA Euro 2020